Gilbert Baker may refer to:

 Gilbert Baker (artist) (1951–2017), American artist; designer of the rainbow flag
 Gilbert Baker (politician) (born 1956), Republican politician in the U.S. state of Arkansas
 Gilbert Baker (bishop) (1910–1986), Anglican Bishop of Hong Kong and Macau

See also
 Edmund Gilbert Baker (1864–1949), English plant collector and botanist; son of John Gilbert Baker
 James Gilbert Baker (1914–2005), US astronomer and designer of optics systems
 John Gilbert Baker (1834–1920), English botanist
 Gilbert Barker (1882–1952), Australian rules footballer